Vagn Ingerslev (23 March 1885 – 28 December 1952) was a Danish tennis player. He competed in two events at the 1912 Summer Olympics.

References

External links
 

1885 births
1952 deaths
Danish male tennis players
Olympic tennis players of Denmark
Tennis players at the 1912 Summer Olympics
People from Vordingborg Municipality
Sportspeople from Region Zealand